Just Say Yes is the debut EP by The Narrative featuring six songs and produced by Bryan Russell. It was released independently on August 30, 2008.

Background 

The Narrative started the recordings of Just Say Yes on 2007 to 2008 after the band meeting through the Craiglist Ad, in the apartment of Suzie Zeldin. According with Jesse Gabriel, the band took influences of Death Cab for Cutie and Jimmy Eat World to compose the sound of the EP. The band was helped by Bryan Russell in the development of its sound and direction of recordings.

Promotion and release 
Just Say Yes was released through the project The Record Collective on August 30, 2008. After its release, the EP was featured in the front page of Myspace and also on episodes of MTV's Reality TV Shows: "Real World: Brooklyn" and "Real World: Cancun", Jersey Shore, TV Shows on MTV2, MTV's Canada Peak Season as well on VH-1, Nickelodeon's series Gigantic, TeenNick, National Geographic and Starz. They also received a very positive unsigned showcase on Absolutepunk.net, or Enemies Unsigned VIP Band and named in the AbsolutePunk Top 100.

Critical reception 

The EP received positive reviews at AbsolutePunk.net "If you do not love Just Say Yes upon first listen, then odds are you will by your fifth (and onto your thirtieth) for certain, as dissecting these little pop gems is as fun as getting lost in their surface grandeur."

Track listing

Personnel
The Narrative
 Suzie Zeldin – vocals, keys
 Jesse Gabriel – vocals, guitar

Technical and production
 Bryan Russell – producer at RedWire Audio
  Mike Kalajian  – mastering
 Victoria Zeldin – backing Vocals
 Charles Seich – drums
 Brandon Strothman – bass
 Ted Feldman – Cello

 Visuals and imagery
 Laura Berger – designer
 Ian McAlister – art direction
 Danica Selvaggio – design concept

Release history

References

External links

 Just Say Yes at Myspace (streamed copy where licensed) 

2008 debut EPs
The Narrative EPs